Elections to Down District Council were held on 20 May 1981 on the same day as the other Northern Irish local government elections. The election used three district electoral areas to elect a total of 20 councillors.

Election results

Note: "Votes" are the first preference votes.

Districts summary

|- class="unsortable" align="centre"
!rowspan=2 align="left"|Ward
! % 
!Cllrs
! % 
!Cllrs
! %
!Cllrs
! %
!Cllrs
! %
!Cllrs
! %
!Cllrs
!rowspan=2|TotalCllrs
|- class="unsortable" align="center"
!colspan=2 bgcolor="" | SDLP
!colspan=2 bgcolor="" | UUP
!colspan=2 bgcolor="" | DUP
!colspan=2 bgcolor="" | Alliance
!colspan=2 bgcolor="" | Workers Party
!colspan=2 bgcolor="white"| Others
|-
|align="left"|Area A
|24.4
|2
|bgcolor="40BFF5"|43.0
|bgcolor="40BFF5"|3
|24.4
|2
|7.3
|0
|0.0
|0
|0.9
|0
|7
|-
|align="left"|Area B
|bgcolor="#99FF66"|50.5
|bgcolor="#99FF66"|3
|17.5
|1
|0.0
|0
|9.5
|0
|14.1
|1
|8.4
|1
|6
|-
|align="left"|Area C
|bgcolor="#99FF66"|51.2
|bgcolor="#99FF66"|4
|20.8
|1
|13.9
|1
|8.4
|1
|5.7
|0
|0.0
|0
|7
|- class="unsortable" class="sortbottom" style="background:#C9C9C9"
|align="left"| Total
|42.1
|9
|27.3
|5
|13.0
|3
|8.4
|1
|6.5
|1
|2.7
|1
|20
|-
|}

Districts results

Area A

1977: 4 x UUP, 2 x SDLP, 1 x Alliance
1981: 3 x UUP, 2 x SDLP, 2 x DUP
1977-1981 Change: DUP (two seats) gain from UUP and Alliance

Area B

1977: 4 x SDLP, 1 x UUP, 1 x Alliance
1981: 3 x SDLP, 1 x UUP, 1 x Republican Clubs, 1 x Independent Labour
1977-1981 Change: Republican Clubs and Independent Labour gain from SDLP and Alliance

Area C

1977: 4 x SDLP, 2 x UUP, 1 x Alliance
1981: 4 x SDLP, 1 x UUP, 1 x Alliance, 1 x DUP
1977-1981 Change: DUP gain from UUP

References

Down District Council elections
Down